Oybarchin Bakirova (27 June 1950 – 20 March 2020) was an Uzbek actress, People's Artist of the Republic of Uzbekistan (2000).

Life 
Oybarchin Bakirova was born on June 27, 1950 in Andijan in the family of actor, People's Artist of Uzbekistan Abbos Bakirov. She was one of two daughters and two sons in the family. Bakirova grew up in a family of artists and wanted to become an actress from a young age. After graduating from high school, she studied at the Tashkent University of Theater and Fine Arts.

In 1971, Bakirova graduated from the Tashkent Institute of Theater and Art and began her career at the Uzbekfilm film studio. From 1971 to 1973, she was working in Uzbek Drama Theater and from 1973 in Uzbek Theater of Film Actor.

Career 
Bakirova has created various characters in dozens of films, such as "Children of Coin", "Harmony", "Game" and "My Child". She is also known through her work in the field of dubbing having voiced over a hundred movie and cartoon characters. In 2000, Bakirova was awarded a title of People's Artist of the Republic of Uzbekistan (2000).

Oybarchin Bakirova died on 20 March 2020 at the age of 70, and was buried at Chigatay cemetery in Tashkent.

Filmography 

 1986  - The secret journey of the emir
 1986  - Ukhodya, ostayutsya
 1987  - Clinic
 1988  - Look
 1988  - Monster or someone else
 1988  - Shock ("With love and pain") TV movie
 1989  - Leader for one shift
 1989  - Conspiracy
 1990  - Code of Silence
 1990  - The reluctant killer
 1991  - Iron Man
 1992  - Alif Leila ("Cunning from the tales of 1001 nights")
 1993  - Kosh ba kosh

References 

1950 births
2020 deaths
Uzbekistani actresses
People's Artists of Uzbekistan
20th-century Uzbekistani actresses